The Staatliches Museum Schwerin (State Museum Schwerin) is an art gallery and museum in Schwerin in Germany. It was established by Frederick Francis II, Grand Duke of Mecklenburg-Schwerin in 1882 its historicist Haupthaus as the Staatsgalerie next to the Staatstheater. Its other locations are opposite the Schweriner Schloss and in the former residences at Schloss Güstrow and Schloss Ludwigslust.

Collections 
It is nationally known for its medieval collections, including the Neustädt Altarpiece and its 17th-century Dutch and Flemish collections. It also holds major collections of Fürstenberg porcelain. With 90 works, the Staatliches Museum Schwerin owns one of the most significant collections of French-American artist Marcel Duchamp in Europe.

The museum is a member of the Konferenz Nationaler Kultureinrichtungen, a union of more than twenty cultural institutions in the former East Germany.

Gallery

Bibliography
Karin Annette Möller: Porzellan aus Fürstenberg. Katalog, Schwerin 2002,

External links 
Staatliches Museum Schwerin
The Duchamp Collection of the Staatliches Museum Schwerin
 The Duchamp-Research Centre is part of the Staatliches Museum Schwerin.
Virtual tour of the Staatliches Museum Schwerin provided by Google Arts & Culture

Art museums and galleries in Germany
Buildings and structures in Schwerin
Museums in Mecklenburg-Western Pomerania
Art museums established in 1882
1882 establishments in Germany